Andreas Falk (born February 27, 1983, in Huddinge, Sweden) is a Swedish professional ice hockey player, currently with Luleå HF of the Swedish Hockey League (SHL).

Playing career
Falk started his active playing career in 1999 with Huddinge IK youth section. In 2001 he played with the senior team in the Swedish tier two league HockeyAllsvenskan. After two seasons with Huddinge he changed to fellow HockeyAllsvenskan team, Skellefteå AIK. For season 2006–2007 he signed with the Elitserien team HV71 and contributed in winning the Swedish Championship in 2008 with the team.

In 2012, Falk signed with Kölner Haie of the Deutsche Eishockey Liga (DEL) in Germany. He stayed until the end of the 2015–16 campaign before on April 30, 2016, he penned a two-year deal with Luleå HF of the SHL.

Career statistics

Regular season and playoffs

International

Awards
 Elitserien playoff winner with HV71 in 2008.
 Elitserien playoff silver medal with HV71 in 2009.

References

External links
 

1976 births
Huddinge IK players
HV71 players
Kölner Haie players
Living people
Skellefteå AIK players
Swedish ice hockey centres